The 31st annual Berlin International Film Festival was held from 13 to 24 February 1981. The Golden Bear was awarded to the Spanish film Deprisa, Deprisa directed by Carlos Saura. The retrospective was dedicated to British film producer Michael Balcon, as well a tribute to Turkish film director Yılmaz Güney who was a political prisoner at the time. The guest of the Homage was German film director Peter Pewas.

Jury
The following people were announced as being on the jury for the festival:
 Jutta Brückner, director, screenwriter and producer (West Germany) - Jury President
 Denis Héroux, director and producer (France)
 Astrid Henning-Jensen, director and screenwriter (Denmark)
 Irina Kupchenko, actress (Soviet Union)
 Peter Bichsel, journalist and writer (Switzerland)
 Antonio Isasi-Isasmendi, director, screenwriter, editor and producer (Spain)
 Chatrichalerm Yukol, director (Thailand)
 Jerzy Płażewski, film critic, writer and film historian (Poland)
 Italo Zingarelli, producer (Italy)

Films in competition
The following films were in competition for the Golden Bear award:

Out of competition
 Ordinary People, directed by Robert Redford (USA)
 Raging Bull, directed by Martin Scorsese (USA)

Key
{| class="wikitable" width="550" colspan="1"
| style="background:#FFDEAD;" align="center"| †
|Winner of the main award for best film in its section
|}

Retrospective
The following films were shown in the retrospective dedicated to Michael Balcon: 

The following films were shown in the homage dedicated to Peter Pewas:

Awards

The following prizes were awarded by the Jury:
 Golden Bear: Deprisa, Deprisa by Carlos Saura
 Silver Bear – Special Jury Prize: Akaler Sandhane by Mrinal Sen
 Silver Bear for Best Actress: Barbara Grabowska for Gorączka
 Silver Bear for Best Actor: 
 Anatoly Solonitsyn for Dvadtsat shest dney iz zhizni Dostoevskogo
 Jack Lemmon for Tribute
 Silver Bear for an outstanding single achievement: Markus Imhoof for Das Boot ist voll
 Honourable Mention:
 Le Grand Paysage d'Alexis Droeven
 Tsigoineruwaizen

References

External links
31st Berlin International Film Festival 1981
1981 Berlin International Film Festival
Berlin International Film Festival:1981 at Internet Movie Database

31
1981 film festivals
1981 in West Germany
1980s in West Berlin
Berlin